Wadotes is a genus of North American funnel weavers first described by R. V. Chamberlin in 1925.

Species
 it contains eleven species:

Wadotes bimucronatus (Simon, 1898) – USA
Wadotes calcaratus (Keyserling, 1887) – USA, Canada
Wadotes carinidactylus Bennett, 1987 – USA
Wadotes deceptis Bennett, 1987 – USA
Wadotes dixiensis Chamberlin, 1925 – USA
Wadotes georgiensis Howell, 1974 – USA
Wadotes hybridus (Emerton, 1890) – USA, Canada
Wadotes mumai Bennett, 1987 – USA
Wadotes saturnus Bennett, 1987 – USA
Wadotes tennesseensis Gertsch, 1936 – USA
Wadotes willsi Bennett, 1987 – USA

References

External links

Agelenidae
Araneomorphae genera
Spiders of North America